A  is an Islamic astronomical book that tabulates parameters used for astronomical calculations of the positions of the sun, moon, stars, and planets.

Etymology
The term is believed to refer to the arrangement of threads in weaving, which was transferred to the arrangement of rows and columns in tabulated data.

Historically significant zijes 
The Zij-i Sultani, published by the astronomer and sultan Ulugh Beg in 1438/9, was used as a reference  throughout Islam during the early modern era.

History
Some of the early zījes tabulated data from Indian planetary theory (known as the Sindhind) and from pre-Islamic Sassanid Persian models, but most zījes presented data based on the Ptolemaic model. A small number of the zījes adopted their computations reflecting original observations but most only adopted their tables to reflect the use of a different calendar or geographic longitude as the basis for computations.  Since most zījes generally followed earlier theory, their principal contributions reflected improved trigonometrical, computational and observational techniques.

The content of zījes were initially based on that of the Handy Tables (known in Arabic as al-Qānūn) by Ptolemy, the Zij-i Shah compiled in Sassanid Persia, and the Indian Siddhantas by Aryabhata and Brahmagupta. Muslim zijes, however, were more extensive, and typically included materials on chronology, geographical latitudes and longitudes, star tables, trigonometrical functions, functions in spherical astronomy, the equation of time, planetary motions, computation of eclipses, tables for first visibility of the lunar crescent, astronomical and/or astrological computations, and instructions for astronomical calculations using epicyclic geocentric models. Some zījes go beyond this traditional content to explain or prove the theory or report the observations from which the tables were computed. Due to religious conflicts with astrology, many astronomers attempted to separate themselves from astrology, specifically intending for their zījes not to be used for astrological computations. However, many zījes were used this way regardless, such as Ibn al-Shatir's al-Zij al-jadīd.

Over 200 different zījes have been identified that were produced by Islamic astronomers during the period from the eighth to the fifteenth centuries.  The greatest centers of production of zījes were Baghdad under the Abbasid caliphs in the 9th century, the Maragheh observatory in the 13th century, the Samarkand observatory in the 15th century, and the Constantinople Observatory of Taqi ad-Din in the 16th century. Nearly 100 more zijes were also produced in India between the 16th and 18th centuries. One of the most famous Indian zijes was the Zij-i Muhammad Shahi, compiled at Jai Singh II of Amber's Jantar Mantar observatories. It is notable for employing the use of telescopic observations. The last known zij treatise was the Zij-i Bahadurkhani, written in 1838 by the Indian astronomer Ghulam Hussain Jaunpuri (1760–1862) and printed in 1855, dedicated to Bahadur Khan. The treatise incorporated the heliocentric system into the zīj tradition.

List

 Az-Zīj ‛alā Sinī al-‛Arab — by Ibrahim al-Fazari (d. 777) and Muhammad al-Fazari (d. 796/806)
 Az-Zīj al-Mahlul min as-Sindhind li-Darajat Daraja — by Yaʿqūb ibn Ṭāriq (d. 796)
 Zīj al-Sindhind — by al-Khwarizmi (c. 780–850)
 Az-Zij as-Sabi — by Muhammad ibn Jābir al-Harrānī al-Battānī (Albatenius) (853–929)
 Zij al-Safa'ih (Tables of the disks of the astrolabe) — by Abū Ja'far al-Khāzin (900–971)
 Zij al-Kabir al-Hakimi — by Ibn Yunus (c. 950–1009)
 Az-Zīj al-Jamī wal-Baligh (The Comprehensive and Mature Tables) — by Kushyar ibn Labban (971–1029)
 Zīj-i Malik-Shāhī (Astronomical Handbook with Tables for Malikshah) (1079) — by Omar Khayyam (1048–1141)
 Almanac of Azarqueil (1088) — by Abū Ishāq Ibrāhīm al-Zarqālī (Azarqueil) (1028–1087)
 Tables of Toledo — based on Abū Ishāq Ibrāhīm al-Zarqālī (Azarqueil) (1028–1087)
 Az-Zīj As-Sanjarī (Sinjaric Tables) — by al-Khazini (fl. 1115–1130)
 Zij-i Ilkhani — by Nasīr al-Dīn al-Tūsī (1201–1274)
 al-Zij al-jadīd — by Ibn al-Shāṭir (1304-1375)
 Huihui Lifa (Muslim System of Calendrical Astronomy) — published in China a number of times until the early 18th century,
 Khaqani Zij — by Jamshīd al-Kāshī (1380–1429)
 Zij-i-Sultani (1437) — by Ulugh Beg (1393–1449)
 Unbored Pearl (1579–1580) — by Taqi al-Din Muhammad ibn Ma'ruf (1526–1585)
 Zij-i Muhammad Shahi — by Jai Singh II of Amber (1688–1743)
 Zij-i Bahadurkhani (1838) — by Ghulam Hussain Jaunpuri (1760–1862)

See also
 Astrometry
 Epoch (astronomy)
 Ephemeris
 Star catalogue

Notes

References
 E. S. Kennedy.  "A Survey of Islamic Astronomical Tables". Transactions of the American Philosophical Society, New Series, 46, 2.  Philadelphia, 1956.  (A revised version in preparation by Benno van Dalen will include over 200 zijes).

Further reading
 Islam, Quran and Science: A List of Islamic Astronomical Tables by Zakaria Virk

Astronomical works of the medieval Islamic world
Astrological works of the medieval Islamic world
Astronomical tables
Persian words and phrases